Mystic Peak is a mountain summit in the Canadian Rockies of Alberta, Canada.

Description

Mystic Peak, elevation 2,960 meters (9,711 feet), is located in the Sawback Range northeast of the Bow Valley Parkway in Banff National Park. The prominent peak is situated 10 kilometers east of Castle Junction, two kilometers southwest of Mystic Pass, two kilometers northwest of Mystic Lake, and three kilometers north of Mount Ishbel. The peak and pass are named in association with Mystic Lake which is a popular destination for fishing for cutthroat trout. Precipitation runoff from the mountain drains west into Johnston Creek which is a tributary of the Bow River, and east to the Cascade River via Forty Mile Creek. Topographic relief is significant as the summit rises 1,320 meters (4,430 feet) above Johnston Creek in three kilometers (1.9 mile).

Climate

Based on the Köppen climate classification, Mystic Peak is located in a subarctic climate zone with cold, snowy winters, and mild summers.  Winter temperatures can drop below −20 °C with wind chill factors below −30 °C.

Geology

Like other mountains in Banff Park, the mountain is composed of sedimentary rock laid down from the Precambrian to Jurassic periods. Formed in shallow seas, this sedimentary rock was pushed east and over the top of younger rock during the Laramide orogeny.

See also

Geology of the Rocky Mountains
Geography of Alberta
Alberta's Rockies

References

External links
 Weather: Mystic Pass
 Parks Canada web site: Banff National Park
 Mystic Peak (photo): Flickr

Two-thousanders of Alberta
Alberta's Rockies
Canadian Rockies
Banff National Park
Mountains of Banff National Park